Große Vils is a river of Bavaria, Germany. At its confluence with the Kleine Vils near Gerzen, the Vils is formed.

See also
List of rivers of Bavaria

References

Rivers of Bavaria
Erding (district)
Landshut (district)
Rivers of Germany